Laura Elena, Countess von Bismarck-Schönhausen (née Martínez Herring; March 3, 1964), known professionally as Laura Harring, is a Mexican-American actress. In 1985, Harring became the first Hispanic woman crowned Miss USA. She later began her acting career in television and film. She is best known for her dual roles as Rita and Camilla Rhodes in the 2001 postmodern neo-noir film Mulholland Drive. She is also known for her roles in other films, including The Forbidden Dance (1990), John Q (2002), Willard (2003), The Punisher (2004), The King (2005), Love in the Time of Cholera (2007), Ghost Son (2007), The Caller (2008), Drool (2009), Sex Ed (2014), and Inside (2016). She also played Carla Greco in General Hospital (1990–1991), Paula Stevens on Sunset Beach (1997), and Rebecca "Becca" Doyle in The Shield (2006).

Early life
Harring was born in Los Mochis, Sinaloa, Mexico on March 3, 1964. Her mother, María Elena Martínez-Cairo, is a spiritual teacher, real estate investor, and former secretary. Her father, Raymond Herring, was a developer and organic farmer of Austrian-German descent. The two divorced in 1971. Harring lived the first ten years of her life in Mexico, before her family relocated to San Antonio, Texas. Harring suffered a head wound from a .45 bullet when she was caught by stray fire from a driveby shooting at age 12. At age 16, she convinced her family to let her study in Switzerland at Aiglon College. She eventually returned to the United States, settling down in El Paso, Texas and entering the world of beauty pageants. She won the title of Miss El Paso USA, and soon after, Miss Texas USA, ultimately going on to win the title of Miss USA 1985. Harring spent the next year traveling through Asia, exploring Europe and working as a social worker in India.

Career

Harring studied theatre at the London Academy of Performing Arts, having trained in the Italian commedia dell'arte, as well as Latin dances, including the Argentine tango. She began her acting career in the film Silent Night, Deadly Night 3: Better Watch Out! Harring played the supporting role of Jerri, a flight attendant and the girlfriend of the brother of one of the protagonists, Chris, who joins them for family dinner at their grandmother's house. In television, she portrayed Raúl Juliá's character's wife in the NBC television movie The Alamo: 13 Days to Glory (1987). She was cast by NBC producers after they saw her on the Miss USA broadcast and contacted her with the role.

In 1990, Harring was lead actress in the Columbia Pictures release The Forbidden Dance, where she played the role of Nisa—a Brazilian princess who travels to Los Angeles  to stop a corporation from demolishing her family home. That same year, she began recurring role on the ABC daytime soap opera General Hospital, as Carla Greco.  The next few years, she had supporting roles in films - Exit to Eden (1994), and Black Scorpion II: Aftershock (1997). In 1997, she played the role of Paula Stevens in the NBC soap opera Sunset Beach. After leaving the show, she guest-starred on Frasier in the episode "Dial M for Martin", and appeared in the comedy film Little Nicky.

Harring is most well known for her performance in David Lynch's film Mulholland Drive (2001), opposite Naomi Watts and Justin Theroux. She played both the characters of Rita (an amnesiac who names herself after Rita Hayworth when seeing the name on a poster for the movie Gilda) and Camilla. In response to her performance and the choice of her for the role, film critic Roger Ebert wrote, "Not many actresses would be bold enough to name themselves after Rita Hayworth, but Harring does, because she can. Slinky and voluptuous in clinging gowns, all she has to do is stand there and she's the first good argument in 55 years for a Gilda remake." Comparisons were also made between Harring and Ava Gardner by the International Herald Tribune. In 2002, she was awarded the American Latino Media Arts (ALMA) Award for Outstanding Actress in a Feature Film for her performance. Harring went on to work twice more with Lynch—as an anthropomorphic rabbit in the limited series Rabbits (2002) and in a cameo appearance in Inland Empire (2006).

In 2002, she appeared in John Q, and was female lead opposite Jean-Claude Van Damme in Derailed. In 2003, she starred in Mi Casa, Su Casa together with Barbara Eden. In 2004, she was the spoiled wife of antagonist Mr. Saint (John Travolta), Livia Saint in the movie adaptation of Marvel Comics's The Punisher. In 2005, Harring starred in the independent film The King, and later had roles in Nancy Drew, Love in the Time of Cholera, The Caller, and Drool, where she plays an abused wife fleeing her husband.

In 2006, Harring joined the cast of FX's crime drama, The Shield, as defense attorney Rebecca Doyle, appearing in nine episodes of season five. In the role, she is hired by lead character Vic Mackey to protect his team of corrupt police officers against an Internal Affairs investigation. From 2009 to 2010, she also had a recurring role as Evelyn Bass/Elizabeth Fisher in The CW series Gossip Girl. In the show, she plays a woman posing as the long-lost mother of the character Chuck Bass, before her deceit is discovered by the other characters. She also guest-starred on Law & Order: Special Victims Unit in 2003, Law & Order: Criminal Intent in 2010, and NCIS: Los Angeles in 2012 and 2016. Harring was also cast in the independent film The Loner directed by Daniel Grove. In 2016 she was cast in the English-language remake of the film Inside, and in Legendary's first digital film The Thinning, alongside Logan Paul and Peyton List. In 2022, she appeared in the romantic comedy Father of the Bride playing Diego Boneta's mother.

Personal life
In 1987, Harring married Count Carl-Eduard von Bismarck-Schönhausen, great-great-grandson of Otto von Bismarck. Though the couple divorced in 1989, she retains the title of Countess von Bismarck-Schönhausen.

Filmography

Film

Television

References

External links

 
 

1964 births
20th-century American actresses
21st-century American actresses
Actresses from Sinaloa
American film actresses
American people of Austrian descent
American people of German descent
American actresses of Mexican descent
American television actresses
American soap opera actresses
Bismarck family
German countesses
Hispanic and Latino American actresses
Living people
Mexican beauty pageant winners
Mexican emigrants to the United States
Mexican film actresses
Mexican television actresses
Mexican people of Austrian descent
Mexican people of German descent
Miss Universe 1985 contestants
Miss USA winners
People from El Paso, Texas
People from Los Mochis
Alumni of Aiglon College